The Psefir is a river in Krasnodar Krai, Russia, which flows into the Fars. The area around the river is populated by various Abadzekh and Circassian tribes. The stanitsa of Kostromskaya stands on the river.

References

Rivers of Krasnodar Krai